Michael Counts (born in 1970) is an American stage director and designer of theater, opera, and immersive performance events and a creator and producer of large-scale public art installations and digital platforms. He has been described in The New York Times as a “mad genius” and “a master of immersive theatre”,in Variety as having the "grandest ambitions" of leading pioneers of immersive theater in New York City.

Counts has worked in a wide range of contexts and locations including a performance on the side of a mountain in Japan, a custom-designed bus that made Times Square and the surrounding streets its stage, an immersive environment for a program of spatial music for symphony orchestra presented in a drill hall, a six-story video tower in a planned community in Florida, and two immersive adaptations of Dante’s The Divine Comedy: the first an evening performance in a series of walk-through installations in a 40,000 square foot Brooklyn warehouse and the second in an escape room maze in Midtown Manhattan.  He has also directed and designed opera productions at Lincoln Center for the Performing Arts, New York City Center, the Cutler Majestic Theatre at Emerson College, and on tour at the Hong Kong Arts Festival.  Many of his innovations anticipated new developments in the worlds of live performance, design and the digital realm.

Counts is the Founding Director of Counts Projects  and produces his work in New York City.  He has served as a consultant for Disney theme parks and other global entertainment and media companies.  He was a co-founder of GAle GAtes et al., a performance and visual art company initially resident with the Lower Manhattan Cultural Council (LMCC) at various locations in Manhattan and on tour in Asia before taking up residence in the Brooklyn warehouse.

Early life and education 

Counts was born and raised in New York City, the son of Carolyn Counts Fox (née Lawler) and Dr. Robert Milton Counts. He studied Theatre and Economics at Skidmore College from 1988 to 1993, where he created The Life and Times of Lewis Carroll, a performance that was both an abstract re-interpretation of Alice In Wonderland and a poetic performative portrait of Lewis Carroll. At Skidmore, Counts also created the "Failure Series", an open forum of experimental performance concepts that continued after he graduated under the leadership of collaborators Ian Belton  and Yehuda Duenyas. The series included a wide range of performance, theatrical, operatic and scenic elements spread over several acres of Skidmore Campus which anticipated much of his later work with immersive performance installations and theater.

His most notable influences from his time at Skidmore were Gautam Dasgupta and his then wife, Bonnie Marranca, co-founders of the PAJ: Performing Arts Journal. Counts went on to study with Dasgupta off and on for the next 20 years.

Career

Theater and Performance 

In his formative years, Counts was drawn to the work of theater and visual artists who forged idiosyncratic and often fiercely independent artistic paths, including Robert Wilson, Reza Abdoh, Richard Foreman, Joseph Cornell, John Cage and Merce Cunningham, Robert Rauschenberg, Marcel Duchamp, Antonin Artaud, and Gertrude Stein.  A common thread was the way the work of these artists was fueled by a subconscious or non-literal dynamic generated through collisions and confluences along the intersections of visual art, literature, music, sound, and live performance.

After graduating from Skidmore, Counts founded the C & Hammermill Company and Exhibition Space in a 100 ft.-long warehouse in Saratoga Springs. Counts collaborated with company members on a series of installations, site-specific performances and guerrilla artworks.

When he moved back to New York City, he co-founded GAle GAtes et al.

After creating his second work for the Metropolitan Museum of Art promenade, The Making of a Mountain, in 1995, Counts directed and designed a series of performances and installations from 1996 to 1997 in multiple indoor and outdoor locations in Manhattan and in touring residencies in Thailand and Japan, gathering a growing circle of artistic collaborators along the way.

In New York, 90 Degrees from an Equinox? Where are We? And Where are We Going? was a twelve-hour performance installation that took place over the course of six days in a 65,000 sq. ft. space on the 51st floor of 55 Water Street.  Texts by Gertrude Stein and John Cage were performed alongside original and found texts by actors performing in an environment made of a field of wild grass harvested from Jamaica Bay. wine-blue-open-water was a walk-through performance installation freely adapted from Homer’s Odyssey with a pre-recorded text by Ruth Margraff. Set elements were rolled in on wagons past performers stationed like statues on a vacant floor of 67 Broad Street.  Counts and the company also produced Oh… A Fifty-Year Dart (a series of episodes that unfolded over the course of three months), Departure, Ark, and TO SEA: Another Mountain at a range of locations including Grand Central Terminal, the SoHo Arts Festival and the Tunnel nightclub.

Internationally, a nine-member company went to Thailand to collaborate with the BoiSakti Dance Theatre of Indonesia under the auspices of the Bangkok-Bali-Berlin Festival, and Counts, Stern and Oglevee were joined by composer Joseph Diebes to study Butoh at Min Tanaka’s Body Weather Farm in Japan. At the Farm, Counts directed and designed I Dug a Pit a Meter Six in Either Direction and Filled it Full of Sake. I Mixed in Honey and Milk and Poured It Over Barley and Pine Nuts and Rice and Onion and Fruit and Blood and Stopped. The performance was set halfway up a mountain, requiring the audience to make an arduous hike then descend at night, the experience of which was integrated into the performance concept. Counts described the work as occupying the territory “when dance-theatre starts to bleed more into proper theater”.

After completing the LMCC residency, Counts began to search for a permanent home for the company that could accommodate the cinematic perspectives that were now a constant in his work.  Brooklyn Academy of Music Executive Producer Joseph V. Melillo pointed him to the Brooklyn waterfront neighborhood now known as DUMBO, where David Walentas of Two Trees Management offered him a lease for a 40,000 square foot warehouse and shopfront gallery in exchange for the company attracting a steady stream of visitors to what was then a somewhat forbidding neighborhood. Counts, Stern and Diebes were joined by resident artists Michael Anderson, Tom Fruin and Jeff Sugg to create four large-scale performance installations and mount numerous exhibitions and off-site events over the following five years. To SEA: Another Ocean, a performance installation for four performers and 500 blue umbrellas, marked the official opening of the space in September 1997.

The first fully staged production Counts directed and designed in the new space was The Field of Mars, which was inspired by Tacitus’ account of the burning of Rome. A one-line summary in the playbill read "This performance is as a dream is, or a landscape. Its meaning is more or less what you determine." The pre-show began in the shopfront gallery as the audience milled around a bar and one by one noticed an actor dressed in elegant evening wear suspended high above on a wire. He descended a ladder with his hands, then led the audience up a ramp decorated with a frieze of tiny flames (a reference to the Great Fire of Rome) to the warehouse space above, where they encountered a series of episodes described in The New York Times as “a fun house for the senses… a cascade of images conjured by the conscious and subconscious, and with the question of how pictures framed in the mind's eye make their way into everything, from ancient myth to abstract paintings to commercial movies." The audience was guided through multiple installations by intelligent and moving stage lights and Diebes’ through-composed electronic score: a living room whose back wall disappeared to reveal a pixie in a slowly receding forest, a tryst in a public bathroom mounted on wheels and swirling around the space, a family dinner at an ornate and extravagantly long table, a tartan-skirted schoolgirl emerging from the top of a wardrobe, and more. A sequel, The Field of Mars - Chapter 1, was mounted in 2006 by Counts Media.

Tilly Losch, produced later in 1998 and described by Counts as “a dream one might have had if falling asleep after watching Casablanca”, took its inspiration from the eponymous shadow box sculpture by Joseph Cornell. It was the first of two GAle GAtes et al. productions in which the audience was seated for the duration so that the 120 feet throw of the backstage area was visible through the false proscenium of an industrial passageway. The advantages of having permanent access to a warehouse space began to be fully utilized in Tilly Losch. Set elements could be tinkered with and refined over the course of months.  A new mechanism was developed that could tilt a wall imperceptibly over the course of two minutes, operated by hand wrenches.

The title of 1839 (1999) refers to the year photography was invented, and was conceived as a dream of Daguerre “in which a child, in the guise of Oedipus, wanders through a landscape peopled by narcissists in love with their own photographed images.”  The landscape was a kinetic collage of multi-layered, allusive imagery.  There were yet more three-dimensional reproductions of artworks – Manet’s Olympia, a large classical still life, a cat from a Balthus painting – interwoven with invented scenarios.  A hermaphrodite appeared in different guises, at one point dressed in a sailor costume identical to the ones adorning a statue of a child and worn by the Oedipus character. An armadillo puppet stood up on its hind legs to reveal a naked young woman on whose skin an image of the solar system was projected.  There were multiple scenes involving a surreally distanced Oedipal coupling of two actors who recited a combination of Sophocles and invented texts.  At one point, the Oedipus figure shot arrows across the full throw of the backstage area at a circle of light as the Jocasta character looked on.

The last large-scale performance installation produced by GAle GAtes et al. in DUMBO was So Long Ago I Can’t Remember (2001) a free adaptation of Dante’s The Divine Comedy with a text by Kevin Oakes pre-recorded by the actors (who lip-synched their lines in the live performance) and choreography by Roht. So Long Ago marked a return to the walk-through format of previous performance installations. Dante’s nine circles of hell were depicted in a series of installations in which audience members alternately roamed and were seated as multiple performances unfolded around them - and, at some points, in their midst. The audience observed the scene while walking over an elevated walkway as Manhattan's East River skyline appeared across the water through the shopfront windows of the gallery.

The only theatre production Counts has directed since was Play/Date, a site specific “immersive theatre experience” produced by 3 Legged Dog and installed in the three levels of the Fat Baby nightclub on the Lower East Side.

Opera and Orchestral Music 

In 2011, Director of New York City Opera (NYCO) George Steel invited Counts to direct and design a new production entitled Monodramas at Lincoln Center.  Monodramas was an evening of works for solo soprano and orchestra: the world stage premiere of La Machine de l'Être by John Zorn, Erwartung by Arnold Schoenberg, and the US stage premiere of Neither by Morton Feldman, with a libretto by Samuel Beckett.

In 2012, Counts was invited by New York Philharmonic Music Director Alan Gilbert to direct and design New York Philharmonic 360, a staging of “spatial music” for orchestra in the Park Avenue Armory’s Drill Hall presented in-the-round. Counts designed an immersive lighting and performance environment for works by Gabrieli, Boulez, Mozart, Stockhausen and Ives that included living statues costumed for their subsequent performance of the Act I finale of Mozart's "Don Giovanni" which the audience encountered in a space under the bleachers upon entering, and large luminous screens installed behind each orchestra that glowed in blue, red and yellow. There were three orchestras for Stockhausen's Gruppen, arranged in a circle, with audience sections in the center and in between.  The performance was featured in a free worldwide webcast on Medici.tv.

Counts returned to New York City Opera in 2013 to direct and design Rossini’s Moses in Egypt. The set design featured a backdrop of LED screens displaying imagery created in collaboration with Ada Whitney, co-founder and creative director of Beehive. Animations of night skies, deserts, and the parting of the Red Sea were interspersed with abstract shapes and video of natural forms.  Through the use of an LED backdrop, Counts was able to realize on a big screen the cinematic pans and aerial shots that had been an implied element of his live stage work, while adding new effects through confronting the invented time on the LED screens with the real time of the live performance, partly through the use of a revolving stage.  Moses in Egypt marked the first time New York City Opera had performed in its original home, City Center, since moving to Lincoln Center in the mid ‘60s.

In 2016, Counts staged the world premiere of the seven-hour The Ouroboros Trilogy, a production by Beth Morrison Projects presented by Arts Emerson at the Cutler Majestic Theatre in Boston, MA. The work united three scores by Scott Wheeler (Naga), Zhou Long (the Pulitzer Prize-winning Madame White Snake) and Paola Prestini (Gilgamesh) under the umbrella of libretti written by a single author, Cerise Lim Jacobs. Madame White Snake was presented at the Hong Kong Arts Festival in March 2019.

Immersive and Interactive Events and Installations 

The first work Counts created after 9/11 was Looking Forward, a video homage to New York City mounted in April–May 2002 in the clock faces of the DUMBO clocktower. A looped series of video portraits showed the faces of volunteers who had recorded messages describing “New York moments”. The audio of the voices of the New Yorkers who were interviewed, set to an original soundtrack, was simulcast by WFMU on May 3.

After GAle GAtes et al. closed in 2003, Counts embarked on a series of interactive works situated in the public realm.  In Yellow Arrow (2004), Counts collaborated with Christopher Allen, Brian House, and Jesse Shapins to create “Massively Authored Public Art” that was a forerunner of the geospatial web in its creation of a “deep map” of the world. Volunteers who submitted online requests were sent coded stickers by mail and asked to write a message, place the stickers in a location of their choice, and submit a photograph of the site by SMS.  In 2005 Counts and the Yellow Arrow Mobile App/Global Public Art Project created an immersive installation and exhibition for Piaget at Art Basel Miami, and in 2006 extended the scope of the project to an augmented reality game called ICUH8ING. An estimated 7,535 Yellow Arrow stickers were placed in 467 cities and 35 countries worldwide.

Visual Art 

GAle GAtes et al.’s move to a permanent home in 1995 brought with it an obligation to attract a steady flow of visitors.  Initially with Stern and later with New York City gallerists including Mike Weiss, Counts co-organized a series of exhibitions from 1996 to 1999 that attracted a steady flow of visitors to the DUMBO shopfront gallery. In 2001-2, Counts collaborated with Bob Bangiola (then at New York's Brooklyn Academy of Music), and Anne Ellegood (now Executive Director of the Institute of Contemporary Art, Los Angeles), on organizing the Emerging Curator Series, whose unifying principle was viewing the curator as an artist. While there was resistance to this concept in New York's visual arts establishment, the series became a valued early career platform for curators and artists who soon thereafter rose to prominence in the art world.  A few years later, curators in the US were widely regarded as having the capacity to be producing artists - as they already had been in Europe for some time - and scholarly articles were being written about the phenomenon.

In 2011, Counts created a series of twelve sculptures that took key motifs from Monodramas, the evening of operas for soprano and orchestra he was directing and designing at Lincoln Center.  Six of the twelve sculptures in the series, entitled Dream Sequence 3:52:29 am–3:56:12 am, were displayed in the lobby of the theatre during performances of Monodramas as visual elements integral to the experience of the evening as a whole.  The other six sculptures were simultaneously exhibited at John McWhinnie at Glenn Horowitz.

In 2016, Counts collaborated with Florida artist JEFRË and 3-Legged Dog on creating The Beacon and Code Wall, a six-story hyperbolic convex-concave tower animated by dynamic video designs commissioned by the Tavistock Development Company for the planned community of Lake Nona in Florida.

Talks and Presentations 
Counts has been a featured speaker at MIT’s Media Lab, Omnicom’s Global Summit for the Radiate Group, and on panels hosted by City College and The Rockefeller Foundation. He has led workshops at several schools and other educational institutions including the California Institute of the Arts, Chiang Mai and Bangkok Universities, the Williamstown Theater Festival, and NYU’s Tisch School of the Arts. Michael’s media concepts have been presented at MIT and at Ericsson’s Innovation Lab in Stockholm.  He launched A-Plan Coaching in February 2018 and the iTunes podcast Producing Innovation in February 2019.

Style 

A key inspiration is the work of the American director and designer Robert Wilson, to whom Counts is often compared and was a conscious influence. Some of the titles and locations of Counts's early work paid direct homage to Wilson. While there are clear similarities between their work, Counts emerged from Wilson's shadow and found his own voice relatively early in his career.  This is arguably because Counts drew so deeply on the raw material of his own personal experiences in his work – submerged as these were beneath multiple layers of allusion.  Some have speculated that the reason his work continues to draw routine comparison with Wilson is due to the decline in the number of avant-garde artists active in performance beginning in the 1990s. In other words, the contexts in which his work could be fully understood and appreciated have narrowed considerably – there simply aren’t many other artists to compare him to.

A constant thread in Counts's work is the experience of immersion. In his own words: "My approach with all the things I’ve ever staged was to create a world and then immerse the audience in that world… Creating an alternate reality where the rules were different, but it held together. It might be very abstract, but it held a certain logic that the whole world operated within. It was then a compelling experience to be a voyeur in that world on the part of the audience." Counts arguably created his most highly developed immersive environments in GAle GAtes et al.’s 40,000 square foot warehouse space, which served as a kind of laboratory in which he incubated performance concepts that grew more and more elaborate and refined over the course of the five years the company was in residence.

This feeling can be compared to walking through the galleries of an art museum, much as Counts wandered through the Metropolitan Museum of Art as a child. In some of the sequences in The Field of Mars, the experience was more like exploring different rooms in a nightclub, or, in the eyes of Peter Marks of The New York Times, "a little bit like chasing a two-year-old around an apartment." In Art and America, Douglas Davis described the Field of Mars audience as "dazzled witnesses to a cosmic event." In PAJ: A Journal of Performance and Art, Michael Rush describes the experience of a Counts production as "akin to diving into a hypertext on the internet, but he’s doing all the clicking and controlling. It’s also like cruising through a fun house at the carnival, but the creatures popping out of the darkness aren’t just screaming, they’re reciting oblique texts from classical literature, art criticism, Fellini movies, and Dada playlets."

Personal life 

Counts lives in Brooklyn Heights with his wife Sharon and two sons.

Works 

 1992 AC/DC (co-directed with Gautam Dasgupta and Phil Soltanoff)
 1992 The Life and Times of Lewis Carroll 
 1992 Failure Series
 1993 Waterloo Mills and the Kings of Prussia
 1993 Kral
 1994 Frontier and the Kings of Prussia
 1995 The Making of a Mountain
 1995 90 Degrees from an Equinox? Where are We? And Where are We Going?
 1996 To SEA: Another Mountain
 1996 Departure
 1996 Ark
 1997 Oh… A Fifty-Year Dart
 1997 wine-blue-open-water
 1997 I Dug a Pit a Meter Six in Either Direction and Filled it Full of Sake. I Mixed in Honey and Milk and Poured It Over Barley and Pine Nuts and Rice and Onion and Fruit and Blood and Stopped
 1997 To SEA: Another Ocean
 1997 The Field of Mars 
 1998 Tilly Losch
 1999 1839
 2000 Listen to Me 
 2001 So Long Ago I Can’t Remember
 2002 Looking Forward
 2002 The World: An Immersive Installation Performance
 2005-8 Yellow Arrow
 2006 The Field of Mars: Chapter 1
 2006 ICUH8ING
 2007/8 BILL: The World’s First Live and Interactive Video Billboard
 2008 MOBKASTR
 2010-17 The Ride New York 
 2011 Monodramas
 2011 Dream Sequence 3:52:29 am–3:56:12 am 
 2012 New York Philharmonic 360 
 2013 Moses In Egypt 
 2014 Walking Dead Escape 
 2014 Play/Date
 2014 Michael Kors – Jet Set Event 
 2015 The Beacon at Lake Nona
 2015-16 The Walking Dead Experience – Chapter 1
 2016 PARADISO: Chapter I
 2016 Betty & Veronica by Rachel Antonoff
 2016 Ouroboros Trilogy
 2017 Road Trip - Bang on a Can 
 2017 The Path of Beatrice
 2017 PARADISO: Chapter 2
 2017 Amgen - The Repatha Escape
 2018 A.HUMAN - NY Fall Fashion Week
 2018 August Moon Drive-In
 2019 Madame White Snake - Hong Kong Arts Festival
 2019 Baltimore Orioles fan experience
 2019 HOODOO: The Legend of Creole Joe - Spiegelpalast Berlin
 2019 Producing Innovation - iTunes Podcast

References

External links 

 https://countsprojects.net/

American opera directors
1970 births
Living people